Emily Sian Joyce (born 12 April 1969) is an English actress best known for playing the role of Janet Dawkins in the BBC comedy series My Hero, between 2000 and 2006.

Early life

Joyce is the youngest of three sisters, all of whom are in the entertainment business in the UK. Their mother loved the theatre and took the three girls to shows constantly. Joyce decided to join the National Youth Theatre at the age of fifteen and worked for Vogue magazine for sustenance during this time before going to train at the Webber Douglas Academy of Dramatic Art. At the age of seventeen she formed, and was the lead singer, in the band In Spite of All That. Including the time in drama school, Joyce spent three years as a part of this band.

Career highlights
After drama school, Joyce joined the Royal Shakespeare Company. Her first television role was in the ITV drama Cracker, where she played the murderer in a 1995 episode. She also starred in another ITV1 drama series, Grafters, in 1999 and in 2003 played the part of DC Havers's new boss in The Inspector Lynley Mysteries.

Joyce appeared in the British comedy series My Hero. She played the character of Janet Dawkins, opposite superhero Thermoman, originally played by Ardal O'Hanlon and followed by James Dreyfus.

In 2003 she appeared in series 2 episode 6 of Ultimate Force, playing the part of Nicky Strong.

Also in 2003 Joyce played vengeful serial killer Anna Marchant/Sarah Herd in the two part BBC crime Drama Messiah 2: Vengeance is Mine starring Ken Stott

In 2007, she appeared in the light-hearted drama Hotel Babylon, playing the part of Estelle. She also played Kate in the comedy drama Little Devil.

In the first half of 2008, she appeared in Happy Now?, a new play by Lucinda Coxon at the National Theatre, London. Also in 2008, she appeared in the six-part BBC comedy drama series Mutual Friends as Martin's (Marc Warren) boss Sarah Fletcher.

In 2010, Joyce played the part of Dr Sandra Fleming in Universal Soldier: Regeneration. In the same year she appeared as the Prime Minister's special policy advisor, Claire Sutton, in Antony Jay's and Jonathan Lynn's stage version of Yes, Prime Minister, which premiered at the Chichester Festival in May 2010 and moved to the Gielgud Theatre in London's West End in September 2010. In 2011, Joyce appeared in Series 7, Episode 19 of the BBC school-based drama Waterloo Road as local superstar DJ Viv O'Donnell. In 2013, Joyce appeared in an episode Down Among the Fearful of the ITV drama Lewis as Jane Grace. In 2011, Joyce starred in the one-off BBC Christmas show, Lapland.

Personal life

Joyce married Adam Astle in 2002. They have two sons. She is the sister of the author Rachel Joyce.

Filmography

References

External links 

Emily Joyce Bio

1969 births
Living people
English television actresses
Royal Shakespeare Company members
People educated at Sydenham High School
English stage actresses
National Youth Theatre members